Roberto de Jesus may refer to:

 Roberto de Jesus (footballer) (born 1969), Brazilian football manager and centre-back
 Roberto de Jesús (volleyball) (fl. 2006-2008), Dominican volleyball player